Nicolaysen is a surname. Notable people with the name include:
Nicolay Nicolaysen (1817–1911), Norwegian archaeologist
Julius Nicolaysen (1831–1909), Norwegian professor of medicine
Nicolay Nicolaysen Sontum (1852–1915), Norwegian engineer, businessperson and contractor
Wilhelm Nicolaysen (1869–1944), Norwegian barrister and businessperson

See also 
Nicolaisen, surname